The following are the Pakistan national football team results in its official international matches.

Legend

Result

1950–59

1950

1952

1953

1954

1955

1958

1959

1960–69

1960

1961

1962

1963

1965

1967

1969

1970–79

1970

1974

1978

1980–89

1981

1982

1984

1985

1986

1987

1988

1989

1990–99

1990

1991

1992

1993

1995

1996

1997

1999

2000–09

2000

2001

2002

2003

2005

2006

2007

2008

2009

2010–19

2011

2012

2013

2014

2015

2018

2019

2022

Overall record 

Teams in italic means that it is inactive

References

External links 
 FIFA.com Pakistan fixtures